Lightbulbs is the third album by Fujiya & Miyagi, released in 2009. The song "Uh" was featured in TV series "Breaking Bad" and "Misfits." "Sore Thumb" was featured in NBA 2K10.

Track listing
 "Knickerbocker"
 "Uh"
 "Pickpocket"
 "Goosebumps"
 "Rook to Queen's Pawn Six"
 "Sore Thumb"
 "Dishwasher"
 "Pterodactyls"
 "Pussyfooting"
 "Lightbulbs"
 "Hundreds & Thousands"
 "Je Ne Comprends Pas" (Special Edition Bonus Track)
 "One Trick Pony" (Special Edition Bonus Track)

References

External links
 Pitchfork Preview

Fujiya & Miyagi albums
2008 albums